Elena or Yelena Volkova may refer to:

Yelena Volkova (volleyball) (born 1960), Soviet volleyball player and Olympic gold medalist
Yelena Volkova (swimmer) (born 1968), Soviet swimmer and world champion
Elena Volkova (painter) (1915–2013), Ukrainian painter
Elena Volkova (basketball) (born 1983), Russian basketball player